A milium (plural milia), also called a milk spot or an oil seed, is a clog of the eccrine sweat gland. It is a keratin-filled cyst that can appear just under the epidermis or on the roof of the mouth. Milia are commonly associated with newborn babies, but can appear on people of all ages. They are usually found around the nose and eyes, and sometimes on the genitalia, often mistaken by those affected as warts or other sexually transmitted diseases. Milia can also be confused with stubborn whiteheads.

In children, milia often disappear within two to four weeks. For adults, they can be removed by a physician (a dermatologist has specialist knowledge in this area). A common method that a dermatologist uses to remove a milium is to nick the skin with a #11 surgical blade and then use a comedone extractor to press the cyst out.

See also
Eruptive vellus hair cyst
Sebaceous hyperplasia
Seborrheic keratosis

References

Epidermal nevi, neoplasms, and cysts
Conditions of the skin appendages